Christopher Columbus: The Discovery is a 1992 American historical adventure film directed by John Glen. It was the last project developed by the father and son production team of Alexander and Ilya Salkind. The film follows events after the fall of the Emirate of Granada (an Arab principality which was located in the south of Spain), and leads up to the voyage of Columbus to the New World in 1492.

Its behind-the-scenes history involved an elaborate series of financial mishaps, which later brought about an emotional falling-out between Alexander and Ilya; as a frustrated Alexander would later lament in a November 1993 interview with the Los Angeles Times, "I know, after this, that I'll never make movies again."

The film was released for the 500th anniversary of Columbus' voyage.  The premiere took place at almost exactly the same time as 1492: Conquest of Paradise, which has often led to confusion between the two films.

Plot 

The titular Genoese navigator overcomes intrigue in the court of King Ferdinand and Queen Isabella of Spain and gains financing for his expedition to the West Indies, which eventually leads to the European discovery of the Americas.

Cast 

Marlon Brando as Tomás de Torquemada
Tom Selleck as King Ferdinand V
Georges Corraface as Christopher Columbus. 
Rachel Ward as Queen Isabella I. 
Robert Davi as Martín Pinzón
Catherine Zeta-Jones as Beatriz Enriquez de Arana
Oliver Cotton as Harana
Benicio del Toro as Alvaro Harana
Mathieu Carrière as King John
Manuel de Blas as Vicente Pinzon
Glyn Grain as De La Cosa
Peter Guinness as Fra Perez
Nigel Terry as Roldan
Simon Dormandy as Bives
Michael Gothard as the Inquisitor's spy
Branscombe Richmond as Indian Chieftain
Christopher Chaplin as

Production 
The initial director George P. Cosmatos left the production due to “creative differences,”  with Cosmatos later suing the producers for millions with the matter settled out-of-court. Cosmatos was then replaced by John Glen shortly before shooting began.  At one point during the production, the $42 million budget was being slashed with the producers considering scrapping the theatrical approach in favor of a TV miniseries.  However, this was alleviated when Ilya Salkind was able to secure a budget of $50 million.

Casting
Marlon Brando received $5 million for the film, and his name remains in the credits despite his request that it be removed. Following Cosmatos’ departure as director, actors Timothy Dalton and Isabella Rossellini soon followed suit with Dalton later filing a lawsuit against the producers for breach of contract and fraud, stating that they did not provide a bank guarantee for his $2.5 million salary.

Reception 
The film was not a commercial success, debuting at No. 4 and grossing $8 million against its $45 million budget.

The film received mostly negative reviews, with a rotten 7% rating on Rotten Tomatoes based on 29 reviews, with the website's critical consensus reading "Ironically, for a biopic about a voyage many associate with people accepting that the world is round, Christopher Columbus: The Discovery falls completely flat."
 Brando's performance in particular was singled out as his "worst". 

Roger Ebert agreed with this sentiment while giving the movie one out of four stars, stating "This movie takes one of history's great stories and treats it in such a lackluster manner that Columbus's voyage seems as endless to us as it did to his crew." It is also on his “Most Hated” list.

Film historian Leonard Maltin declared the picture a "BOMB" (he gave 1492: Conquest of Paradise an only-slightly-better rating, and conveyed his sentiments with this variation on the popular rhyme: "In nineteen-hundred-and-ninety-two, Columbus sailed two screen boo-boos.")...adding that the movie was hardly ripe for re-discovery, and lamenting "Is this any way to celebrate the 500th anniversary of Europe's finding America?"

Audiences surveyed by CinemaScore gave the film a grade of "C" on scale of A+ to F.

Lawsuits
Director Ridley Scott had considered making a Christopher Columbus movie for the Salkinds but instead opted to direct a rival project from producer Alain Goldman and written by Roselyne Bosch: 1492: Conquest of Paradise. The Salkinds filed a lawsuit against Scott, alleging that the director stole ideas from their project.  $40 million in damages were sought, in addition to a ruling barring Scott from proceeding with the Goldman-backed film.   Throughout November 1990, various contemporary sources pointed out that the scripts for the two projects were rumored to be quite different: Scott’s “biopic” would survey twenty-three years of Columbus’s life, while Salkind’s “adventure-epic” would focus on the singular event of discovering the Americas in 1492.  Six months after filing the lawsuit against Scott, the Salkinds decided to abandon it.  Goldman and Salkind acknowledged that releasing two films on the same subject at approximately the same time could split audiences and box office returns, but with both “Columbus” pictures angling for a release date to coincide with the 500-year anniversary, the conflict seemed unavoidable.

In September 1994, producer Ilya Sakind, along with Ilya 's wife and the film's executive producer Jane Chaplin, sued Alexander Salkind, co-producer Bob Simmonds, and other creditors for $10 million.

Awards 
Tom Selleck won the Golden Raspberry Award for Worst Supporting Actor. Marlon Brando was also nominated for Worst Supporting Actor and the film received another four Golden Raspberry Award nominations including; Worst Picture, Worst Director – John Glen, Worst New Star – Georges Corraface and Worst Screenplay – Mario Puzo.
At the 1992 Stinkers Bad Movie Awards, it received a nomination for Worst Picture.

Home media 
The film was released on VHS and LaserDisc formats from Warner Home Video in 1993. It has not been released on DVD in North America, but is available in other format regions on DVD.

See also 

 1492: Conquest of Paradise, another big budget, all-star epic about Columbus also released in 1992.
 Carry On Columbus – A comedy-film about Columbus released in 1992.
 The Magic Voyage, an animated film about Columbus also released in 1992.

References

External links 
 
 
 

1992 films
American biographical films
1990s adventure films
1990s biographical films
Films set in the 1490s
Fiction set in 1492
Films set in Spain
Films set in pre-Columbian America
Films shot in the United States Virgin Islands
Cultural depictions of Christopher Columbus
Cultural depictions of Isabella I of Castile
Cultural depictions of Tomás de Torquemada
Films scored by Cliff Eidelman
Films directed by John Glen
Films with screenplays by Mario Puzo
British biographical films
English-language Spanish films
Spanish biographical films
Age of Discovery films
Epic films based on actual events
Sea adventure films
Historical epic films
Films with screenplays by John Briley
Golden Raspberry Award winning films
1990s English-language films
1990s American films
1990s British films